The 2003–04 CEV Champions League was the 45th edition of the highest level European volleyball club competition organised by the European Volleyball Confederation.

League round

Pool A

|}

Pool B

|}

Pool C

|}

Pool D

|}

Pool E

|}

Playoffs

Playoff 6

|}

First leg

|}

Second leg

|}

Final Four
Organizer:  Lokomotiv Belgorod
 Place: Belgorod

Semifinals

|}

3rd place match

|}

Final

|}

Final standings

External links
 2003/04 European Champions League

CEV Champions League
2003 in volleyball
2004 in volleyball